This is a list of members of the Victorian Legislative Council, as elected at the 2022 state election.

Current distribution of seats 
 

 Matthew Guy announced during the 2022 Election Campaign that Renee Heath will not sit in the Liberal party room if elected, due to her "ultra-conservative" views and support of the "abhorrent" practice of gay conversion therapy.

References

Members of the Parliament of Victoria by term
21st-century Australian politicians
Victorian Legislative Council